The Duchy of Parma and Piacenza, was an Italian state created in 1545 and located in northern Italy, in the current region of Emilia-Romagna.

Originally a realm of the Farnese family after Pope Paul III made it a hereditary duchy for his son, Pier Luigi Farnese, it was ruled by the dynasty until 1731, when the last duke, Antonio Farnese, died without direct heirs. 

It was invaded by Napoleon and annexed by France, having its sovereignty restored in 1814 after Napoleon’s defeat. Napoleon's wife, Marie Louise (Maria Luigia), then ruled as its duchess until her death. Parma was restored to Bourbon rule in 1847, and in 1859, the duchy was formally abolished as it was integrated into the new Italian state.

History

The Duchy of Parma was created in 1545 from parts of the Duchy of Milan south of the Po River, which had been conquered by the Papal States in 1512. These territories, centered on the city of Parma, were given as a fief for Pope Paul III's illegitimate son, Pier Luigi Farnese.

In 1556, the second Duke, Ottavio Farnese, was given the city of Piacenza, becoming thus also Duke of Piacenza, and so the state was thereafter known as the Duchy of Parma and Piacenza. The Farnese family continued to rule until the extinction of their male line in 1731.

Because of the lack of male heirs, Elisabeth Farnese, niece of Duke Antonio Farnese, was declared the Farnese heiress. She received many marriage proposals, finally getting married in 1714 with Philip V, King of Spain. On the death of childless Duke Antonio in 1731, Philip V of Spain asserted the rights that his wife had over the duchies according to the agreements signed in the Treaty of Vienna of 1725 and the Treaty of Seville of 1729, and he claimed both for the Spanish House of Bourbon. The Duchy would thus be inherited by his first son with Elisabeth, Infante Carlos of Spain, who will reign as Duke Charles I of Parma and Piacenza. He ruled his territories for four years until the end of the War of the Polish Succession, when, according to what was established in the Treaty of Vienna of 1738, he handed over both duchies to the House of Habsburg in exchange for the Kingdoms of Naples and Sicily.

The Habsburgs only ruled until the conclusion of the War of the Austrian Succession in 1748, whose final peace treaty, the Treaty of Aix-la-Chapelle, ceded back the Duchy to the Bourbons in the person of Infant Philip of Spain, younger brother of Charles I. Duke Philip became the founder of the House of Bourbon-Parma, reigning over an expanded Duchy of Parma, Piacenza and Guastalla. 

In 1796, the duchy was occupied by French troops under Napoleon Bonaparte, and the political situation of the state became extremely confused. Duke Ferdinand maintained his throne under French military governors until the Treaty of Aranjuez of 1801, when a general agreement between the House of Bourbon and Napoleon formally decided the cession of the duchy to France in exchange for Tuscany, but the Duke lasted in Parma until he died in 1802.

The consolidation of the duchy 
Ottavio Farnese strove to make the duchy prosperous, to win the benevolence of the people by applying the wise measures already taken by his father and to flatter the local nobility using more moderation than Pier Luigi, he knew how to consolidate the duchy by promoting its economy and financial and commercial exchanges and cultural, it started the territorial expansion with the annexation of some fiefdoms. In 1573 the number of inhabitants of the new capital had increased considerably reaching 26,000. Alexander Farnese, who was also an important general of the Spanish army,  succeeding the leadership of the duchy, was forced by the King of Spain Philip II to appoint his seventeen-year-old son Ranuccio I Farnese, as regent, since the Spanish King did not want to deprive himself of the able and valiant general.

Alessandro died far from Parma on 3 December 1592 from gangrene caused by an arquebus ball during the siege of Can de Bec, a year before his death he ordered the construction of the fortress of the Citadel with the aim of affirming the power of the family but also to provide work to a labor force of 2,500 people made up mostly of the poor sections of the city population. Ranuccio I, passionate about arts and music, makes the ducal court the first in Italy in the musical arts. During this period, the city was enriched with unique monuments, such as the Palazzo della Pilotta and the Teatro Farnese, modern legislation is passed, which made Parma a center of excellence both in terms of lifestyle and as an architectural model, elevating it as a cultural capital to the same level of other important European capitals. His government was guilty of the public execution of over 100 Parma citizens accused of conspiring against him. In 1628, on the death of Ranuccio I, the duchy was passed on to his just sixteen-year-old legitimate son Odoardo, who on 11 October of the same year married the fifteen-year-old Margherita de' Medici in Florence, daughter of Cosimo II de' Medici, Grand Duke of Tuscany.

These were difficult years for the duchy, in addition to the terrible plague of 1630 which decimated the population, the new duke maintained an army of 6,000 infantry and to finance it he forced his subjects into severe deprivation, getting into debt with bankers and merchants. Despite the high expenses incurred, his first campaign was negative: Piacenza was occupied by the Spanish troops, his troops were defeated in Parma territory by Francesco I d'Este, Duke of Modena, and the Odoardo was forced to sign a peace treaty with Spain which, one once the alliance with France was dissolved, he would have evacuated Piacenza.

On his death, which took place in Piacenza on 11 September 1646 at the age of 34, the duchy passed to his son Ranuccio II and for two years the regency was ensured by his wife Margherita de' Medici and by his uncle the Cardinal Francesco Maria Farnese, until the age of eighteen. In 1691 the Duchy of Parma was invaded by the imperial troops and plundered by the four thousand soldiers who arrived in Parma with women and children; not only their maintenance fell on the subjects, but rape, abuse and violence followed one another without respite. Ranuccio II made many works to improve the situation of his subjects, but the contrast between the carefree life of the court and the coffers of the treasury was truly remarkable and to keep all the characters who rotated at the court of Parma, the duke was forced to tax everything, avoiding, however, to touch the ecclesiastical income. During his reign, Ranuccio II bought precious paintings and volumes, he moved most of the works belonging to the family collections preserved in the Roman residences to Parma and in 1688 the new Ducal Theater was inaugurated. Ranuccio II had a son destined to succeed him, Odoardo, who, however, premorted his father and therefore never governed the duchy.

Three years before his death, thanks to the mediation of the ambassador Count Fabio Perletti, Odoardo had married Countess Palatine Dorothea Sophie of Neuburg, with whom he had two children: Alessandro, who died at the age of eight months, and Elisabeth. On 11 December 1694, upon the sudden death of Ranuccio II, the duchy then passed into the hands of the just sixteen-year-old second son Francesco, who married the widow of his brother Dorothea.

Rule of Francesco Farnese 
Francesco Farnese's work fully brought the Farnese dynasty back to the center of great politics. Having inherited a disastrous financial situation, in order to try to heal it he cut all the unnecessary expenses of the court by firing most of the servants, musicians, buffoons and dwarves. He also abolished performances, court parties and banquets. A hydraulic work was built to defend the city of Piacenza from the erosion of the Po, the expansion of the University of Parma and the Collegio dei Nobili was favored, encouraging the study of public law, history, languages ​​and geography. Artists, writers, musicians and playwrights enjoyed the protection of the Court. In 1712 the renovation works of the fortress of Colorno began, completed in 1730. In 1714 the duchy achieved an important diplomatic success when Francesco, thanks to the offices of his ambassador in Spain Giulio Alberoni, was able to give his niece Elisabeth in wife to King Philip V, who in that year became the widower of Maria Luisa of Savoy.

Napoleonic era (1796-1814) 
Napoleon Bonaparte was undecided about the future of the duchy, aspiring to a total engagement of the Bourbons in the European wars as his allies. Even as French laws and administration were gradually introduced, the formal annexation to the French Empire was declared only in 1808 after the outbreak of the conflict against Spain. The duchy was reformed as the département of Taro.

Last decades of the duchy (1814 to 1860) 
In 1814, the duchies were given to Napoleon's Habsburg wife, Marie-Louise, styled Maria-Luigia, who ruled them for the rest of her life. After Maria-Luigia's death in 1847, the Duchy was restored to the Bourbon-Parma line, which had been ruling the tiny Duchy of Lucca. Guastalla was ceded to Modena. The Bourbons ruled until 1859, when they were driven out by a revolution following the French and Sardinian victory in the war against Austria (called Austrian War in France and Second War of Independence in Italy).

The Duchy of Parma and Piacenza joined with the Grand Duchy of Tuscany and the Duchy of Modena to form the United Provinces of Central Italy in December 1859, and merged with the Kingdom of Sardinia into the Kingdom of Italy in March 1860 after holding a referendum.

Historical flags and coat of arms

See also
County of Guastalla
Historical states of Italy
House of Farnese
House of Bourbon-Parma
List of Dukes of Parma
Pauline Bonaparte
Pretenders to the throne of Parma

References

Alessandro Cont, Il potere della tradizione. Guillaume Du Tillot e la questione della nobiltà, "Nuova Rivista Storica", 100, 1 (gennaio-aprile 2016), pp. 73–106

External links
 Flags of Parma
 Constitution of 1848 

 
Modern history of Italy
History of Emilia-Romagna
House of Farnese
2nd millennium in Italy
Italian states
Papal States
Italian city-states
1545 establishments in the Papal States
1859 disestablishments in Europe

Parma
States and territories established in 1545
States and territories disestablished in 1859
Former monarchies of Europe
Former duchies